Ceratocombus is a genus of litter bugs in the family Ceratocombidae. There are about nine described species in Ceratocombus.

Species
These nine species belong to the genus Ceratocombus:
 Ceratocombus brevipennis Poppius, 1910 g
 Ceratocombus coleoptratus (Zetterstedt, 1819) i c g
 Ceratocombus corticalis Reuter, 1889 g
 Ceratocombus cuneatus Mc Atee & Malloch, 1925 g
 Ceratocombus hawaiiensis Usinger, 1946 i c g
 Ceratocombus hesperus McAtee and Malloch, 1925 i c g
 Ceratocombus niger Uhler, 1904 i c g
 Ceratocombus taivanus Poppius, 1915 g
 Ceratocombus vagans Mcatee & Malloch, 1925 i c g b
Data sources: i = ITIS, c = Catalogue of Life, g = GBIF, b = Bugguide.net

References

Further reading

 

Ceratocombidae
Heteroptera genera
Articles created by Qbugbot